George Lopez is an American television sitcom that ran on the American Broadcasting Company (ABC) from March 27, 2002, to May 8, 2007, broadcasting a total of 120 episodes over six seasons.

Series overview

Episodes

Season 1 (2002)

Season 2 (2002–03)

Season 3 (2003–04)

Season 4 (2004–05)

Season 5 (2005–06)

Season 6 (2007)

References

Lists of American sitcom episodes